The sulphur-breasted warbler (Phylloscopus ricketti) is a species of Old World warbler in the family Phylloscopidae.
It breeds in China; it winters to Laos, Thailand and Cambodia.
Its natural habitats are temperate forests and subtropical or tropical moist lowland forests.

References

sulphur-breasted warbler
Birds of China
sulphur-breasted warbler
Taxonomy articles created by Polbot